Tennessee is a village in McDonough County, Illinois, United States. The population was 101 at the 2020 census.

History
A post office called Tennessee has been in operation since 1856. The village was named after the state of Tennessee.

Geography
Tennessee is located in western McDonough County at  (40.412204, -90.837508).

Demographics

As of the census of 2000, there were 144 people, 64 households, and 38 families residing in the village. The racial makeup of the village was 98.61% White, 0.69% Native American, and 0.69% from two or more races.

There were 64 households, out of which 25.0% had children under the age of 18 living with them, 50.0% were married couples living together, 7.8% had a female householder with no husband present, and 40.6% were non-families. 37.5% of all households were made up of individuals, and 20.3% had someone living alone who was 65 years of age or older. The average household size was 2.25 and the average family size was 2.95.

In the village, the population was spread out, with 22.2% under the age of 18, 6.9% from 18 to 24, 24.3% from 25 to 44, 27.1% from 45 to 64, and 19.4% who were 65 years of age or older. The median age was 41 years. For every 100 females, there were 94.6 males. For every 100 females age 18 and over, there were 89.8 males.

The median income for a household in the village was $27,188, and the median income for a family was $34,750. Males had a median income of $20,833 versus $23,000 for females. The per capita income for the village was $13,311. There were 9.8% of families and 22.3% of the population living below the poverty line, including 38.5% of under eighteens and none of those over 64.

References

Villages in McDonough County, Illinois
Villages in Illinois